Shaoyang Wugang Airport  is an airport serving the city of Shaoyang in Hunan Province, China. The airport received approval from the State Council of China and the Central Military Commission in July 2013. It is expected to cost 957 million yuan to build. The airport was opened on 28 June 2017, with an inaugural China Southern Airlines flight from Changsha Huanghua International Airport.

Facilities
The airport has a 2,600-meter runway and a 3,000-square-meter terminal building. It is projected to handle 250,000 passengers and 500 tons of cargo annually by 2020.

Airlines and destinations

See also
List of airports in China
List of the busiest airports in China

References

Airports in Hunan
Airports established in 2017
2017 establishments in China
Wugang, Hunan